The 2013–14 season was FC Sheriff Tiraspol's 17th season, and their 16th in the Divizia Naţională, the top-flight of Moldovan football.

Squad

Transfers

In

Out

Loans out

Released

Competitions

Moldovan Super Cup

Divizia Națională

Results summary

Results

League table

Moldovan Cup

UEFA Champions League

Qualifying rounds

UEFA Europa League

Qualifying rounds

Group stage

Squad statistics

Appearances and goals

|-
|colspan="14"|Players away on loan:

|-
|colspan="14"|Players who left Sheriff Tiraspol during the season:

|}

Goal scorers

Disciplinary record

References

External links 
 

FC Sheriff Tiraspol seasons
Moldovan football clubs 2013–14 season